The St. Catharines Falcons were a junior ice hockey team in the Ontario Hockey Association from 1943 to 1947. The team was based in St. Catharines, Ontario, Canada.

History
The Garden City was introduced to OHA Junior "A" Hockey in the fall of 1943 when the St. Catharines Falcons made their debut in the league. Rudy Pilous, a former St. Catharines Sr. "A" hockey player and his friend Jay MacDonald were inspired to bring a team to St. Catharines after watching a Memorial Cup game in Toronto's Maple Leaf Gardens in the spring of 1943 between the Winnipeg Royals and Oshawa Generals.

Pilous would be coach & general manager of the team, and MacDonald would be secretary & treasurer. Pilous raised the capital from talking six local businessmen (Pete Grammar, Ted and Os Graves, Tom Heit, Jack Leach, and Cal Wilson) into investing $500 each. He then took a trip back to his home town of Winnipeg, to hire players for the 1943-44 season. 

The Falcons played their first game on November 13, 1943. The St. Catharines Falcons name came from a naming contest for the new junior team. The winner of the contest was a nine-year-old boy named Jimmy Stirrett from St.Catharines Ontario. 

The team was so unsuccessful, that after two years, the St. Catharines Senior "A" Saints folded. In 1946-47 the club didn't make the playoffs and was in financial trouble. It looked like the end of Junior hockey in the city. In January 1947, George Stauffer, President of Thompson Products Ltd., stepped into the picture and bought the Falcons for $2,500. He saved Junior hockey in St. Catharines, and renamed the team the Teepees.

Today there is an unrelated local Jr. B hockey team in the Golden Horseshoe Junior B Hockey League using the same name as the St. Catharines Falcons.

Players
Several Winnipeg-area players including Harvey Jessiman (goalie), Bing Juckes, Tom Pollock, Laurie Peterson and Doug McMurdy formed the nucleus of the first club, combined along with local players.

Doug McMurdy was awarded the Red Tilson Trophy in 1944-45 as the Most Outstanding Player in the OHA.

NHL alumni are Armand Delmonte, Val Delory, Bing Juckes, and Nick Mickoski.

Yearly results
The Falcons never made it to the league finals for the J. Ross Robertson Cup, but did very well in the regular season, making the playoffs their first three years.

Arena
The St. Catharines Falcons played in the Garden City Arena in downtown St. Catharines, Ontario from 1943-1947. The team shared the arena with the Sr. A. team, the St. Catharines Saints from 1943-1945.

References

1943 establishments in Ontario
1947 disestablishments in Ontario
Defunct Ontario Hockey League teams
Sport in St. Catharines
Ice hockey clubs established in 1943
Ice hockey clubs disestablished in 1947